Ngomongo Villages is a well-known sustainable eco-cultural tourist village in Mombasa, Kenya, which is situated 4° south of the equator. It is situated in a former coral limestone quarry, and the aim of its rehabilitation was to convert it into a sustainable development, while turning it into hospitable land with utility to community, while eliminating its hazards and improving the ecosystem.

Dr. Frederick Gikandi, a local medical doctor started single-handedly to reclaim the quarry by planting  of eighty different indigenous trees; casuarina trees later followed which were easier to cultivate. Public awareness to tree planting was raised by inviting the public to join in the reclamation process.

To date, Ngomongo is fanning out its reclamation exercises to the surrounding farms by recruiting the local farmers into planting trees to mark out their farm borders. The ultimate plan is to fan out the success locally, regionally and then nationally.

Reclamation of quarry site

Inspired by a previously successful project, namely Haller Park initiated by Dr. Rene Haller in Bamburi Beach, Dr. Gikandi applied Haller's approach to rehabilitate the barren substrate. 

At around this time, the Mombasa municipal council  had earmarked  the  quarry as the municipal refuse  dumping site. The built up surrounding urban neighbourhood would have suffered air pollution from the decomposing dumped municipal refuse.

Once reclamation work had started, he then involved individuals and the community in tree planting. This was later followed by incorporation of cultural tourism to ensure sustainability.

Geography and climate

The site is located 4° south of the equator and 40° east of the Greenwich meridian, 10 km north of Mombasa Island, but within Mombasa municipality. It is about 600 m to 700 m inland from the coast.

It is excavated up to a depth of 12 m and is in the coastal and marine tropical climate. Rain falls every month although not reliably, much of the rain falling during the April to June period. Average annual rainfall is about 1,192 mm with a maximum of over 2,056 mm. The number of rain days varies from 85 to 130 except for a marked increase in 1997 due to the El Niño weather conditions. The mean temperature is about 28.8 °C in July and August. Average humidity varies too, with the lowest readings of 65% usually in February and 85% in May.

The coastal region around Mombasa has two monsoon currents: the south east monsoon from May to the beginning of October and the northeast from November to March.

Milestones overcome

Quarry rehabilitation project

Corals usually live in colonies. Each single animal excretes a skeleton of calcium carbonate, which cements with neighbor cell excretions, eventually forming a whole colonial buildup of compacted constructions, which extend over wide areas. Corals don't thrive in temperature below 20 °C and depend on shallow seas for growth. Once the living corals get dry from shifting sea levels, the whole coral structure dies and is then known as coral limestone rock. It is at this stage that man can excavate coral limestone for construction works.

The arid and desolate Ngomongo quarry pit, had been excavated to 12 m but was not conducive to plant growth, and had no hope of being spontaneously inhabited by trees for another decade.

The aim of the quarry rehabilitation was therefore to turn it into good hospitable land, with high utility to the people around, improving the ecosystem, reducing its various hazards, and converting it into a sustainable development.

The total dissolved solid and the salinity of the ground water were studied for planning purposes.

Casuarina project
Tree seedlings from  government forest stations were purchased and  transferred to the quarry.  The quarry's own small seed bank which was established later with the help of the community around the quarry, provided seeds to set up a tree nursery. Planted one meter apart initially, the casuarina were later thinned to two metres apart.

The casuarina did very well and helped in breaking up the coral rock with their carpet like root system. Currently the casuarina trees are of average height of 10 m  and above provide a very good tree cover and  shade for the quarry floor.

The dropping foliage of these trees is broken down  by micro–organism and other small organisms like the millipede. The original millipede population was collected by hand by the neighbourhood community and introduced in large numbers into the quarry.  Millipedes feed on the fallen leaves (needles) breaking them down to release nutrients.

The forest leaf cover composted, adding more humus to the ground, as the number of millipedes increased in this their promised land. Millipedes can reach up to a length of 12 cm, hide under the leaf foliage during the dry season, reappearing in large numbers during the rainy season.

Tree species 

The casuarinas are famous for their prestigious timber, which is used in the construction industry.   The Neem tree is also doing very well, so are the Baobab tree, coconut, mango trees and the date palms, “mvuli”, sausage-tree (“muratina”) and others. The Neem tree (“mwarobaini”) is believed to be able to cure 40 diseases hence the name “mwarobaini”.  “Akamba” carvers use the logs for carving wood sculptures.  Its bark and leaves are used for treating fevers such as due to malaria and other ailments.  The leaves yield a non–synthetic insecticide.  The small branches are used as disposable toothbrushes   The powdered bark of the tree is used for protection of maize granaries against weevils.    The “Muratina” tree spongy fruit is the traditional ‘yeast” for brewing traditional “muratina” brew for the “Kikuyu” and the “Akamba” ( this can be sipped and tasted at the Akamba village of Ngomongo villages) “Mvuli” is a sought for hard wood originally from Tanzania. It is the best oak tree equivalent for furniture in  East Africa.

Plants and insects 

Ferns, mushrooms and other plants which require tree cover  and a lot of humus started appearing after just a few years in the forest. Leaf shedding ants are useful in cutting leaves into small pieces. The ants work day and night. Their leaf shredding habit and their fungal cultivation are beneficial to the forest. These types of ants are many, an example being the weaver ants. The termites are also in large numbers in our forest. The termites feed on soft timber trunks, thus they are usually considered as pests, but they play a great role in reducing the dead wood in forests to  humus.

Flora  
Lantana camara
Castor oil
Okra - ladies finger – (vegetable)  
Pumpkins  
Flamboyant tree  
Terminalia  
Eucalyptus  
Indian almond – (fruit tree) – “mkungu”  
Acacia  
Bamboo  
Saman  
Guava – (fruit)  
Neem tree – (medicine)  
Arrow roots  
Bananas  
Sweet potatoes  
Sisal  
Coffee  
Orange
Cassava  
Sweet potatoes  
Ananas - pineapple  
Cotton  
Cowpeas  
Paw paw
Millet
Whistling acacia
Ficus sycamorus / casuarinas forest
Sugar cane  
Euphorbia
Sorghum
River bamboo

Wetlands 

Natural ponds were dug by an improvised homegrown shovel. The shovel was made from an empty steel water storage tank whose shoveling edge on the tank top was reinforced with a sharpened pickup main leaf spring, welded onto this edge.

With two men sitting on the plough or shovel to give it weight and anchorage, the donkeys would drag the plough or shovel.  This would be repeated many times until the lake was at least one meter deep below the water table. The depth of the three ponds is an average of one meter.

Crocodiles were introduced into one of the ponds that represent Lake Turkana (of northern Kenya) in the village theme. The other pond represents in the village theme, Lake Victoria, which is in western Kenya. Tilapia were introduced into this lake.

Large flocks of birds nest on and feed on these wetlands. These including kingfishers, weaver birds, Egyptian geese and others.

The bird sanctuary 

Within the quarry, a  bird sanctuary has local chicken, ostriches, geese and cranes. The daily feeding of birds at the bird sanctuary has attracted many wild birds like Egyptian geese. These wild birds have established their breeding sites on the quarry rock outcrops and most of them have made the quarry their home. There are now over 50 species of birds in the entire quarry. The birds help in seed dispersal as they feed on wild fruits and drop their droppings on other parts of the forest.

Frequently identified species are:

Egyptian geese
Ostrich
Helmeted guineafowl
Crested cranes
Tortoises
Black water tortoise
Quails
Local chicken
Peacock
Kingfisher
Weaverbirds
Shrikes

Farm gardens 

The quarry now has ten diverse rural Kenya villages, each with a niche of forest, displaying his true "culture" and  "rural home replica".

Among the things they display are huts, utensils, gardens and the crops they grow in their rural areas. The gardens were made by clearing patches of the new forest. Loosening the coral, then putting  of soil and manure cover on which various unique crops are being cultivated. (See FAUNA above).

The land, which was once a lifeless wasteland, now has a diversity of life.

External links 
 NgomongoVillages
 UNEP Article
 Dubai Municipality Article
 The Haller Foundation
 Dr. Rene Haller's Work

Tourism in Kenya
Mombasa